ABC Me (stylised as ABC ME) is an Australian English language children's free-to-air television channel owned by the Australian Broadcasting Corporation. It was officially launched by Prime Minister Kevin Rudd on 4 December 2009 as ABC3.

History
In September 2009, the Australian government announced a proposal to launch a new digital-only children's channel, ABC3. A new ABC channel appeared on television receivers in 2008, as a placeholder for the future ABC3 channel. ABC3 was considered by the Australia 2020 Summit and given as one of the recommendations to the Government. In April 2009, the Government's official response to the Summit approved the idea, and in the 2009–10 Commonwealth Budget $67 million was allocated towards ABC3 as part of the Government's $167 million funding increase to the ABC.

On 18 June 2009, the corporation began its first public ABC3 campaign to scout for new hosting talent. On 22 October 2009, eight presenters were announced. Amberley Lobo and Kayne Tremills would host Studio 3, with Ben Crawley as a roving reporter, he later joined the show What Do You Know? alongside Dr Rhythm. Scott Tweedie would host Prank Patrol, while Hannah Wang and Mitch Tomlinson were named as co-hosts of Rush TV and Stephanie Bendixsen and Steven O'Donnell were hosts of Good Game: Spawn Point, made for younger gamers, a spin-off of the ABC2 TV series Good Game, made for older gamers.

On 4 December 2009 at 5pm, the hour-long Countdown to 3 special was broadcast on the channel and was simulcast on ABC1. It featured special performances from Australian artists Cassie Davis and Short Stack, an introduction to various ABC3 presenters and shows and the station's launch around 6pm by then-Prime Minister Kevin Rudd.

In 2011, James Elmer joined as co-host of Studio 3 along with Kayne and Amberley. On 4 December 2011, the winners from the MeOn3 contest were revealed as Alfie Gledhill and Olivia Phyland. On 14 September 2012, Alfie left Studio 3 to pursue acting dreams. In October 2012, Comedian Khaled Khalafala joined Studio 3, and stayed with the crew until early 2013 before leaving. In March 2013 the Janitor (Dave Cartel) and Bubbles the goldfish supposedly left Studio 3 for Venezuela, with Bubbles being replaced with a new goldfish called Alexis. Tim Matthews, Grace Koh and Ivy Latimer later joined James and Liv in June 2014 after winning The 3 Factor competition.

In August 2016, it was announced that ABC3 would rebrand as ABC ME on 19 September 2016. The rebranded channel is reported to be "designed to reflect and celebrate the lives, interests and diversity of young Australians" and will increase its focus to primary school children. To mark the rebrand, ABC ME teamed up with 16-year-old Australian singer Angel Tairua to record a new song Unique (Me2U) to celebrate the launch of ABC ME.

In June 2020, many of the ABC Me staff located in Melbourne lost their jobs after the redundancies at the ABC were announced, include the presenters of the channel at the time; Pip Rasmussen, Drew Parker and Ava Madon. The network continued to be broadcast without presenters.

Management
ABC ME is operated by the Australian Broadcasting Corporation part of ABC Television. Overall strategic responsibility for all of the ABC's domestic services rests with the Director of Television, David Anderson (since 2017). The direction of ABC ME itself rests with Michael Carrington the current Head of Children's and Education responsible for commissioning all ABC ME content across television, online, and iview.

Programming

The channel's programming runs from 6:00 am to around 10:30 pm everyday, and targets the 7-18-year-old age group. During the station's off hours, the station displays a signpost saying "returns at 6:00 am" with audio from the digital radio station ABC Jazz before reopening again the next day. It broadcasts a range of genres, including comedy, drama, music, animation, extreme sports, wildlife and news-based programmes.

The channel aims to feature at least 50% Australian-produced content. News To Me was a show that was hosted by the channel's presenters, which premiered on Monday 19 September 2016 at 5:10 pm and aired its last episode on New Year's Eve 2018. It was replaced with a new show called Stacked, airing a new episode every weekday at 4:25 pm and is produced by the in-house Children's production team, alongside Good Game: Spawn Point, and Let's Go.  Other programs which air on the channel include the historical drama My Place, sitcom Mal.com, animation series Little J & Big Cuz, a news and current affairs show produced by the team from Behind the News (the longest running program on ABC ME) and a sketch comedy You're Skitting Me. ABC3 created Pet Superstars which also aired on ABC 4 Kids.

Program playout for ABC ME is controlled from ABQ, the ABC's Brisbane station via the ABC's playout facility, MediaHub. Programmes such as Studio 3 and Prank Patrol were filmed and produced at ABV in Melbourne.

Unlike commercial channels, ABC ME is not constrained by a local content quota and portions of its programming are sourced from foreign broadcasters such as CBBC (as Children's BBC), ZDF, Cartoon Network, and Yoopa. In 2017, ABC Me became an associate member of the EBU and earned the contract from SBS and Blink TV to start to select participants and it first broadcast the European Broadcasting Union Junior Eurovision Song Contest 2017 as well as the Junior Eurovision Song Contest 2018 and Junior Eurovision Song Contest 2019.

Current Programming
 100% Wolf: Legend of the Moonstone (2020-Present)
 The Adventures of Puss in Boots
 All Hail King Julien
 Almost Naked Animals
 Arthur (Shared with ABC Kids)
 The Bagel and Becky Show
 Behind the News (2009–present)
 Best Bugs Forever
 Big Blue (2022–present)
 Born to Spy (2021–present)
 Built to Survive (2022–present)
 Camp Lakebottom
 Cartoon It Up (2016–present)
 Cloudy with a Chance of Meatballs
 Create (2017–present)
 Danger Mouse
 The Day My Butt Went Psycho!
 Deadly 60
 The Deep
 Definitely Not News (2020–present)
 Degrassi: The Next Generation
 The Dengineers
 Dennis & Gnasher: Unleashed!
 Dogstar
 Dorg Van Dango
 DreamWorks Dragons
 Droners
 Dwight in Shining Armor
 I, Elvis Riboldi
 The Fairly OddParents
 Find Me in Paris
 First Day (2020–present)
 Get Blake! (2015-Present)
 Good Game: Spawn Point (2010–present)
 Hardball (2019–present)
 Horrible Histories (2015 series)
 The InBESTigators (2019–present)
 Itch (2020–present)
 Kung Fu Panda: Legends of Awesomeness
 Larry the Wonderpup (originally aired on Seven)
 The Legend of Korra
 Little Big Awesome
 Mighty Mike
 Miraculous: Tales of Ladybug and Cat Noir (2016-Present)
 MaveriX (2022–present)
 Mikki vs The World (2021–present)
 Mustangs FC (2017–present)
 The New Legends of Monkey (2018–present)
 Odd Squad
 Oddbods
 Olobob Top
 Operation Ouch!
 The Penguins of Madagascar
 The PM's Daughter (2022–present)
 Rainbow Chicks
 Rise of the Teenage Mutant Ninja Turtles
 Rita and Crocodile
 Robot Wars
 The Rubbish World of Dave Spud
 Sadie Sparks
 School of Rock
 Scream Street
 Secret Life of Boys
 SheZow
 Sir Mouse
 Slugterra
 So Awkward
 Space Nova (2021–present)
 Spirit Riding Free
 Spongo, Fuzz and Jalapeña (2019–present)
 The Strange Chores (2019–present)
 Super Dinosaur
 Supernoobs
 Teenage Mutant Ninja Turtles (2012 series)
 Thalu (2020-Present)
 Thunderbirds Are Go
 Total DramaRama
 The Wacky Word Show
 Wishfart
 The Zoo

Upcoming Programming

Former Programming
 6Teen
 Adventure Time
 Atomic Puppet
 Best Ed
 Canimals
 Grojband
 Kid vs. Kat
 Mr. Magoo
 Oggy and the Cockroaches (Seasons 1-3) (2010-2011)
 Sidekick
 Rugrats
 Total Drama (Seasons 1-5)
 Yakkity Yak

Presenters

 Stephanie "Hex" Bendixsen (2009–2016)
 Dave Cartel ("The Janitor") (2009–2013)
 Ben Crawley (2009–2011)
 Gemma "Gem" Driscoll (2018–present)
 Amberley Lobo (2009–2015)
 Ava Madon (2019–2020)
 Steven "Bajo" O'Donnell (2009–2017)
 Drew Parker (2019–2020)
 Pip Rasmussen (2016–2020)
 Mitch Tomlinson (2009–2012)
 Kayne Tremills (2009–2015)
 Scott Tweedie (2009–2013)
 Hannah Wang (2009–2012)
 Gus "Goose" Ronald (2011–2018)
 James Elmer (2011–2016)
 Alfie Gledhill (2011–2012)
 Olivia Phyland (2011–2015)
 Khaled Khalafalla (2012–2013)
 Grace Koh (2014–2018, 2020)
 Ivy Latimer (2014–2015)
 Tim Matthews (2014–2017)
 Lawrence Gunatilaka (2018–2019)
 Dallas Reedman (2018–2019)
 Ilai Swindells (2018)
 Jael Wena (2019)
 William Yates (2019–2020)
 Angharad "Rad" Yeo (2017–present)

Notes

References

External links

Australian Broadcasting Corporation television
Digital terrestrial television in Australia
English-language television stations in Australia
Television channels and stations established in 2009
Commercial-free television networks in Australia
Children's television networks
Children's television channels in Australia
2009 establishments in Australia